Inverness is an unincorporated community and a census-designated place (CDP) located in and governed by Arapahoe County, Colorado, United States. The CDP is a part of the Denver–Aurora–Lakewood, CO Metropolitan Statistical Area. The population of the Inverness CDP was 1,532 at the United States Census 2010. The Inverness Metropolitan Improvement District and the Inverness Water & Sanitation District provide services to the area, which lies in ZIP code  80112.

Geography

Demographics

Economy
Inverness is the location of Inverness Exchange, where aerospace company Jeppesen and electronics wholesaler Arrow Electronics, the largest company in Colorado in terms of revenue, are headquartered.

See also

Outline of Colorado
Index of Colorado-related articles
State of Colorado
Colorado cities and towns
Colorado census designated places
Colorado counties
Arapahoe County, Colorado
Colorado metropolitan areas
Front Range Urban Corridor
North Central Colorado Urban Area
Denver-Aurora-Boulder, CO Combined Statistical Area
Denver-Aurora-Broomfield, CO Metropolitan Statistical Area

References

External links

Inverness Metropolitan Improvement District
Inverness Water & Sanitation District
The Club at Inverness
Arapahoe County website

Census-designated places in Arapahoe County, Colorado
Census-designated places in Colorado
Denver metropolitan area